{{DISPLAYTITLE:C7H5ClO2}}
The molecular formula C7H5ClO2 (molar mass: 156.57 g/mol, exact mass: 155.9978 u) may refer to:

 2-Chlorobenzoic acid
 3-Chlorobenzoic acid 
 4-Chlorobenzoic acid

Molecular formulas